KQLZ (95.7 MHz) is an FM radio station in Dickinson, North Dakota, United States (licensed to New England). The station was previously using the call letters KLTQ. The station is owned by The Marks Group.

References

External links
 95-7 KQLZ Online
 

QLZ
Radio stations established in 2008
2008 establishments in North Dakota